New College Lanarkshire Motherwell Campus is a further education college located in the Ravenscraig area of Motherwell, North Lanarkshire, Scotland. An independent institution from 1967, in 2013 it merged with Cumbernauld College to form New College Lanarkshire.

History
Originally sited next to Our Lady's High School and Fir Park Stadium in Motherwell, the original building has since been demolished for redevelopment as a housing estate.

It was officially opened in January 2010 by the Princess Royal.

The campus is fully equipped, and has an on-site nursery. There are two librarys/learning centres which members of the public can use on a drop in basis.

Courses at the College

A number of courses are available in the following subject areas, on both a full and part-time basis:

Animation, Design and Media
Automotive Studies
Beauty & Complementary Therapies
Business and Management
Computing & Information Technology
Construction
Education
Engineering
Hairdressing & Make-up Artistry
Health
Health & Safety
Highers/Intermediates
Hospitality
International Baccalaureate Diploma Programme
Languages
Performing Arts
Photography
Professional Cookery
Social Care
Social Sciences
Sport and Fitness
Supported Learning Programmes
Travel and Tourism

Notable alumni
Kate Bracken
Frank Roy
Midge Ure
Karen Fishwick

References

External links

 Official Website
 College at Education Scotland

Educational institutions established in 1967
1967 establishments in Scotland
Further education colleges in Scotland
Buildings and structures in Motherwell
Education in North Lanarkshire
Educational institutions disestablished in 2013
2013 disestablishments in Scotland